David Michael Diehl (born September 15, 1980) is a former American football offensive lineman who played his entire career with the New York Giants of the National Football League (NFL). He was the Giants starting left tackle on two Super Bowl championship teams, beating the New England Patriots in both games. He played college football for the University of Illinois.  The Giants selected him in the fifth round of the 2003 NFL Draft.

Early life
Diehl was born in Chicago, Illinois, on September 15, 1980. He is of Croatian descent on his mother's side, and of German descent on his father's side. When he was younger Diehl and his family frequently visited local Croatian churches and clubs in Chicago. He strengthened his Croatian-American ties after he moved to New Jersey, where the local Croatian community often have him as a visitor. He has the Croatian coat of arms as well as "neuništiv", the Croatian word for indestructible, tattooed on his left arm.

High school career
Diehl attended Catholic schools, including St. Linus Grammar School in Oak Lawn, Illinois, and
Brother Rice High School in Chicago, where he starred on the football, wrestling, and track teams.

College career
Diehl attended the University of Illinois at Urbana–Champaign, where he played for the Illinois Fighting Illini football team. He became a second-team All-Big Ten Conference selection as a senior in 2002. Recipient of the Wright Commitment to Excellence Award, presented to the Illinois player who has dedicated himself to academic excellence despite obstacles faced during his collegiate career. Started every game at left offensive guard, registering 91 knockdowns for an offense that featured its first 1,000-yard rusher (Antoineo Harris) and 1,000-yard receiver (Brandon Lloyd) in the same season since 1984. Helped offense total 5,356 yards. In 2001, saw action at both guard and tackle. Registered 56 knockdowns as he participated in 385 plays for an offense that gained 5,041 yards as the line allowed only 16 quarterback sacks (second in the Big Ten). In 2000, was valuable reserve, seeing action in every game at right guard. Made 15 knockdowns as he participated in 43 plays. In 1999: Played in 6 games on the field goal and extra point protection units. He was redshirted as a freshman in 1998.

Professional career

2003 NFL Draft

New York Giants (2003–2013)
Diehl was drafted by the Giants in the fifth round of the 2003 NFL Draft with the 160th overall selection.

In his rookie season, Diehl started all 16 games, becoming the first Giants rookie to do so since Mark Bavaro in 1985. He was one of 14 NFL rookies to start all 16 games in 2003 and was the only rookie to start at the same position each game during the 2003 season.

In 2005, Diehl played another position, starting 15 regular season games at left guard and 1 game at right tackle. That season, Tiki Barber rushed for a franchise-record 1,860 yards, and Eli Manning passed for 3,762 yards, the 5th-highest total in franchise history.

The Giants signed Diehl to a six-year, $31 million contract in May 2008.

At the end of the 2009 season, Diehl was elected to the 2010 Pro Bowl as a Super Bowl Participant replacement.

Diehl moved from left tackle to right tackle following the release of Rich Seubert and Shaun O'Hara and the signing of David Baas. He had started every game of his NFL career until 2010, when he tore his hamstring and suffered a partially dislocated hip.

At the end of the 2011 season, Diehl and the Giants appeared in Super Bowl XLVI. He started in the game as the Giants defeated the New England Patriots by a score of 21–17.

On August 21, 2013, the New York Giants announced that Diehl will undergo surgery to repair his injured right thumb. The recovery time was expected to be approximately six weeks. On January 24, 2014, Diehl announced his retirement after 11 seasons.

Broadcasting
On August 6, 2014, it was announced Diehl had been hired to work as a color analyst for NFL games on Fox. He teamed with Thom Brennaman as the number #4 team on these telecasts for 2014. During the 2015 season, Diehl worked fewer regular season games because former lead college football on Fox analyst Charles Davis took his place alongside Brennaman. (It was supposed to be Donovan McNabb, but he was arrested for a DUI in July 2015, leading Fox to make this change. Joel Klatt replaced Davis on college football telecasts with Davis's former partner, Gus Johnson). Diehl would move two spots down to the number #6 team to team with Dick Stockton and replacing Stockton's former partners Brady Quinn, Kirk Morrison, and McNabb. For the 2016 and 2017 seasons, Diehl moved down to the #7 crew, where he was teamed with Sam Rosen. In 2017, Diehl joined CBS Sports Network as an college football analyst.

Coaching career

Memphis Tigers
In May of 2022, Diehl announced that he would be joining the coaching staff at Memphis, working for head coach Ryan Silverfield as an offensive analyst. This is Diehl's first collegiate coaching position.

Personal life

Diehl is of mixed German and Croatian descent. His Croat origins are from his maternal grandparents. His grandmother, Lucija Semanic (born Lucia Šamanić) was born in the USA to parents from Krk in 
Croatia, while his grandfather, Ante Bekavac, emigrated to United States from Lovreć. He has a tattoo of the Croatian coat of arms on his left arm. Diehl stated his favorite tattoo is his Croatian coat of arms. He visited Croatia in June and July 2011, in search of his roots.

Diehl played at the University of Illinois, and is a fan of the university's former symbol, Chief Illiniwek. During player introductions on TV, he states his school as "University of Chief Illiniwek." He also has an image of Chief Illiniwek tattooed on his arm.

Diehl received the Wellington Mara NFL Man of the Year Award May 22, 2012, at the annual Boys Hope Girls Hope Dinner.

On the morning of June 11, 2012, Diehl was arrested for suspicion of drunk driving after hitting several parked cars. Diehl was purportedly watching a Croatian soccer game with friends at a bar in Astoria, Queens, NY.

References

External links
New York Giants bio

1980 births
Living people
American football offensive linemen
American people of Croatian descent
American people of German descent
Illinois Fighting Illini football players
National Conference Pro Bowl players
National Football League announcers
College football announcers
New York Giants players
Players of American football from Chicago
Sportspeople from Chicago
Sportspeople from Passaic County, New Jersey